Francesco da Milano (born Francesco Pagani) was an Italian painter from Lombardy.  He was active between 1502 and 1548 and twenty of his works in oil-on-canvas and fresco survive in the hill-country of Treviso and Friuli, including a fresco cycle at Castello Roganzuolo. As a Lombard, some aspects of his style were influenced by Bernardo Zenale and Vincenzo Civerchio, though he was also influenced by Titian, who like him lived and worked in the "contrada de Piai" in Serravalle. Titian was preferred to Francesco by Serravalle's town council - Francesco had been the initial choice to paint the Serravalle Altarpiece.

Bibliography

Baldissin, Mariuccia e Soligon, Antonio, Chiese a San Fior. Alla scoperta del patrimonio artistico, San Fior 2002, pp. 102–120.
Crespi, Leonardi, Zanato, Magia del colore. Chiese affrescate della Marca Trevigiana, Vianello libri, 2008.
Giorgio Tagliaferro, Tiziano Vecellio. Madonna col Bambino in gloria e santi Andrea e Pietro, in Lungo le vie di Tiziano. I luoghi e le opere di Tiziano, Francesco, Orazio e Marco Vecellio tra Vittorio Veneto e il Cadore, a. c. di M. Mazza, Skira, 2007, pp. 54–65.
 Ernst Gombrich - Dizionario della Pittura e dei Pittori - Einaudi Editore  (1997)

16th-century Italian painters